Serine racemase (SR) is the first racemase enzyme in human biology to be identified. This enzyme converts L-serine to its enantiomer form, D-serine. D-serine acts as a neuronal signaling molecule by activating NMDA receptors in the brain.

Since NMDA receptors Dysfunction has been suggested as one of the promising hypotheses for the pathophysiology of schizophrenia, it has been shown that underexpression of this enzyme is an indicator, especially for the paranoid subtype. Treatment of schizophrenia with D-serine has been shown to play some role in ameliorating some symptoms.

In humans, the serine racemase protein is encoded by the SRR gene. Serine racemase may have evolved from L-thre-hydroxyaspartate (L-THA) eliminase and served as the precursor to aspartate racemase.

Mammalian serine racemase is a pyridoxal 5'-phosphate dependent enzyme that catalyzes both the racemization of L-serine to D-serine and also the elimination of water from L-serine, generating pyruvate and ammonia through the β-elimination of L-serine. This makes serine a known bifurcating enzyme. The β-elimination pathway is thought to serve as a bleed valve that allows local stores of L-serine to be diverted away from D-serine as a means of muting the D-serine signaling pathway. The canonical tetraglycine loop that serves as a PLP phosphate binding pocket includes the active residues being F55, K56, G185, G186, G187, G188, and S313.

The enzyme is physiologically stimulated by divalent cations (e.g., magnesium) and is allosterically activated by the magnesium/ATP complex, associated with a conformational change upon nucleotide binding that depends upon interactions with Q89. The canonical coordination sphere of the divalent cation interaction site includes the active residues E210 and D216 within 2.1 angstroms of the ion.

References

Further reading

External links 
 
 

EC 5.1.1
EC 4.3.1